cDVD discs, also known as mini-DVD discs (not to be confused with 8 cm DVDs), are regular data CDs that contain MPEG-2 or MPEG-1 video structured in accordance with the DVD-Video specifications (namely, a VIDEO_TS directory containing properly-authored IFO/BUP and VOB files). Such discs must be written in the so-called "Mode 1", which is compatible with both the ISO 9660 and UDF 1.02 filesystems, and therefore limits the amount of data that can be stored on an 80-minute CD to 700 MB.

By using non-standard resolutions, long GOPs, more B-frames, and high-compression quantization matrices, it is possible to store up to 2 hours of video with audio and subtitles on a regular 80-minute CD. Until 2003, few standalone DVD-players had drives capable of spinning a CD at the 8X rate needed to keep up with the maximum data stream allowed by the DVD-Video specifications, but today, many models contain drives similar to those used on desktop computers, and more versatile firmware as well, so that the proper playback of compact DVDs is often supported, but rarely documented (especially in North America and Europe).

See also 
 Video CD (VCD) and Super Video CD (SVCD) - standards for video on CDs
 BD9 & BD5 - Blu-ray Disc Movie content on DVDs, explicitly allowed by the Blu-ray standard
 AVCHD - a digital video specification loosely based on BDMV which can also be played from Blu-ray and non-Blu-ray sources
 MiniDVD - 8 cm DVDs

References

External links
 ViDEOHelp.com

120 mm discs
Video storage